Frédéric Barbier (born 27 August 1952) is a French historian and research director at Centre national de la recherche scientifique.

Selected publications
 1678, Valenciennes devient française, catalogue d’exposition, Valenciennes : Bibliothèque municipale, 1978
 L'Art de la reliure à travers les collections valenciennoises, Valenciennes : Bibliothèque municipale, 1978
 Valenciennes, de la Réforme au Baroque (1559-1600), Valenciennes : Bibliothèque municipale, 1979
 Trois cents ans de librairie et d'imprimerie : Berger-Levrault (1676-1830), Genève : Droz, 1979
 Douze siècles d'art du livre : trésors de la bibliothèque de Valenciennes, Valenciennes : Bibliothèque municipale, 1980
 L'Image du Monde : cartes, atlas et livres de voyage (XVe-XVIIIe siècles), Valenciennes : Bibliothèque municipale, 1981
 Les Débuts du livre imprimé : éditions du XVe siècle conservées dans les bibliothèques de la région Nord-Pas-de-Calais, Hénin-Beaumont : Association des bibliothécaires français, Groupe Nord, 1982
 Le Patronat du Nord sous le Second Empire : une approche prosopographique, Genève : Droz, 1989
 Finance et politique : la dynastie des Fould : XVIIIe-XXe siècle, Paris : A. Colin, 1991
 L'Empire du livre : le livre imprimé et la construction de l'Allemagne contemporaine (1815-1914), Paris : éd. du Cerf, 1995
 L'Europe et le Livre : réseaux et pratiques du négoce de librairie (XVIe-XIXe siècles), Paris : Klincksieck, 1996 (codirector)
 with Catherine Bertho-Lavenir, Histoire des médias, de Diderot à Internet, Paris : A. Colin, 1996.
 Histoire du livre, Paris : A. Colin, 2000 (2e éd. 2006)
 Lumières du Nord : imprimeurs, libraires et « gens du livre » dans le Nord au XVIIIe siècle (1701-1789) : dictionnaire prosopographique, Genève : Droz, 2002
 Le Berceau du livre, autour des incunables : études et essais offerts au professeur Pierre Aquilon par ses élèves, ses collègues et ses amis, numéro thématique de la Revue française d'histoire du livre, 121, 2003 (dir.)
 Des moulins à papier aux bibliothèques, en 2 volumes : Le Livre dans la France méridionale et l'Europe méditerranéenne (XVIe-XXe siècles) , Montpellier : Université Paul Valery, 2003
 Est-Ouest : transferts et réceptions dans le monde du livre en Europe, 17e-20e siècles, Paris : Msh Paris, 2005
 L'Europe de Gutenberg : le livre et l'invention de la modernité occidentale (XIIIe-XVIe siècle), Paris : Belin, 2006
 (dir.), Paris capitale des livres : le monde des livres et de la presse à Paris, du Moyen Âge au XXe siècle, catalogue de l'exposition, Paris : Paris bibliothèques, 2007
  with Sabine Juratic et Annick Mellerio, Dictionnaire des imprimeurs, libraires et gens du livre à Paris, 1701-1789, Genève : Droz, 2007-…
 Le Rêve grec de monsieur de Choiseul : les voyages d'un Européen des Lumières, Paris : A. Colin, 2010
 Histoire des bibliothèques : d'Alexandrie aux bibliothèques virtuelles, Paris : A. Colin, collection "U-Histoire", 2013.

References 

20th-century French historians
1952 births
Living people
École Nationale des Chartes alumni
21st-century French historians